Sudan Village is a live album by Seals & Crofts. It features the single "Baby I'll Give It to You", which reached #58 on Billboard's charts, #85 on the RPM charts, and #5 on the RPM AC charts.

Track listing 
"Sudan Village" (James Seals, Dash Crofts)
"Advance Guards" (Seals, Crofts)
"Cause You Love" (Seals)
"Baby I'll Give It to You" (Lana Bogan, Seals)
"Thunderfoot" (Seals, Crofts, Louie Shelton, Hampton Hawes, David Hungate, Jeff Porcaro)
"East of Ginger Trees" (Seals, Crofts)
"Put Your Love in My Hands" (Bogan, Walter Health)
"Arkansas Traveller" (Traditional)
"Eighth of January" (Tommy Jackson)

Charts

Personnel
All tracks except "Baby I'll Give It to You"
 Jim Seals – lead vocals, guitar, fiddle, saxophone
 Dash Crofts – lead vocals, mandolin
 Carolyn Willis – lead vocals on "Cause You Love" and "Put Your Love in my Hands"
 Marty Walsh
 Bill Cuomo – keyboards
 Bobby Lichtig – bass
 Ralph Humphrey – drums
 Joe Porcaro – percussion
 Shirley Matthews, Marty McCall, and Becky Louis – backing vocals
 Louis Shelton – production

"Baby I'll Give It to You"
 Jim Seals – lead vocal, guitar
 Dash Crofts – mandolin
 Carolyn Willis – lead vocal
 Louis Shelton – production, guitar
 Dean Parks and Lee Ritenour – guitars
 Bill Cuomo – acoustic piano
 Joe Sample – electric piano
 Wilton Felder – bass
 Ed Greene – drums
 Joe Porcaro – percussion
 Gene Page – string arrangement

References 

Seals and Crofts albums
1976 live albums
Warner Records live albums